Hop – a je tu lidoop is a 1978 Czechoslovak film, directed by Milan Muchna and starring Josef Kemr.

References

External links
 

1977 films
Czechoslovak comedy films
1970s Czech-language films
Czech comedy films
1970s Czech films